Juliett is a variant of the name Juliet or Juliette. It may also refer to:

The code word for the letter J in the NATO phonetic alphabet International Code of Signals and related alphabet codes
J, or "Juliett Time", an observer's local time as a nautical time zone letter or a military time zone; see 
Juliett-class submarine, the NATO moniker for a Soviet submarine, from the letter J
Juliett 484, a submarine in that class
Juliett, Indiana, the former name of Tarry Park, Indiana

See also
 Juliet (disambiguation)
 Juliette (disambiguation)